"Bennington Triangle" is a phrase coined by American author Joseph A. Citro to denote an area of southwestern Vermont within which a number of people went missing between 1945 and 1950. This was further popularized in two books, including Shadow Child, in which Citro devoted chapters to discussion of these disappearances and various items of folklore surrounding the area. According to Citro, the area shares characteristics with the Bridgewater Triangle in Southeastern Massachusetts.

Precisely what area is encompassed in this hypothetical "mystery triangle" is not clear, but it is purportedly centered on Glastenbury Mountain and would include some or most of the area of the towns immediately surrounding it, especially Bennington, Woodford, Shaftsbury, and Somerset. Glastenbury and its neighboring township Somerset were both once moderately thriving logging and industrial towns, but began declining toward the late 19th century and are now essentially ghost towns, unincorporated by an act of the Vermont General Assembly in 1937.

According to Citro's books, stories of strange happenings had been told about Glastonbury and the surrounding area for many years, the best-known of which is probably that of the disappearance of Paula Jean Welden.

Reported disappearances

Middie Rivers (1945)
Between 1945 and 1950, five people disappeared in the area surrounding Bennington, Vermont. The first disappearance occurred on November 12, 1945, when 74-year-old Middie Rivers disappeared while out hunting, in the vicinity of Long Trail Road and Vermont Route 9. Rivers was on a weekend hunting trip with four other hunters up the mountains. The morning of November 12, 1945, Rivers and his son-in-law, Joe Lauzon, were walking together before reaching a fork. Rivers and Lauzon would separate here with Rivers telling Lauzon he'd "only be going a short distance" before he would join them at camp for lunch. As 3pm had come and gone, the rest of the hunting party would begin searching before getting authorities. An extensive search was conducted, but the only evidence discovered was a single rifle cartridge that was found in a stream. The speculation was that Rivers had leaned over and the cartridge had dropped out of his pocket into the water. Rivers was an experienced outdoorsman who was familiar with the local area.

Paula Welden (1946)
Paula Jean Welden, aged 18, disappeared on December 1, 1946. Welden, a sophomore at Bennington College, had set out for a hike on the Long Trail. Many saw her depart, including Ernest Whitman, a Bennington Banner employee who gave her directions. She was not wearing a jacket during her journey; it was 50 °F outside, later dropping to 9 °F. Welden was alleged to have been seen on the trail itself by an elderly couple who were about  behind her. According to them, she turned a corner in the trail, and when they reached the same corner she had disappeared. An extensive search was conducted, which included the posting of a $5,000 reward and help from the FBI, but no evidence of her was ever found. Welden's disappearance was the inspiration for the 1951 novel Hangsaman by Shirley Jackson.

James Tedford (1949)
James E. Tedford, a veteran, allegedly went missing on December 1, 1949, three years to the day after Welden was last seen. Tedford, a resident of the Bennington Soldiers' Home, had been in St. Albans visiting relatives and was accompanied to a local bus station, which was the last location where he was seen. According to witnesses, Tedford got on the bus and was still aboard at the last stop before arriving in Bennington. Somewhere between the last stop and Bennington, he vanished. His belongings were still in the luggage rack and an open bus timetable was on his vacant seat. Tony Jinks discusses this claim, saying that "The popular conception is that he vanished into thin air while on the bus, but like many missing person stories there's a gap between when he was last seen and when he was reported missing a week or so later. Regarding Tedford's disappearance, there's enough evidence to suggest he didn’t "dematerialize,” even though no trace of him was ever found."

Paul Jepson (1950)

On October 12, 1950, Paul Jepson, aged 8, had accompanied his mother in a truck. She left her son unattended for about an hour while she fed some pigs. When she returned, her son was nowhere in sight. Search parties were formed to look for the child. Nothing was ever found, though Jepson was wearing a bright red jacket that should have made him more visible. According to one story, bloodhounds tracked the boy to a local highway where, according to local legend, Welden had disappeared four years earlier.

Frieda Langer (1950)
On October 28, 1950, sixteen days after Jepson had vanished, Frieda Langer, aged 53, and her cousin, Herbert Elsner, left their family campsite near the Somerset Reservoir to go on a hike. During the journey, Langer slipped and fell into a stream. She told Elsner if he would wait, she would go back to the campsite, change clothes and catch up to him. When she did not return, Elsner made his way back to the campsite and discovered that Frieda Langer had not returned, and that nobody had seen her since they had left. Over the next two weeks, five searches were conducted, involving aircraft, helicopters, and up to 300 searchers. No trace of Langer was found during the search.

On May 12, 1951, Frieda Langer's body was found three and a half miles from the campsite in the eastern branch of the Deerfield River, an area that had been only lightly searched seven months previously. No cause of death could be determined because of the condition of her remains. No direct connections have been identified that tie these cases together, other than the general geographic area and time period.

In popular culture
The Bennington Triangle was discussed in Season 3, Episode 8 of the television program William Shatner's Weird or What? The episode, entitled "Mysterious Vanishings," first aired on July 23, 2012.

The events of 1945 to 1950 are told in episode 67 of Lore, titled "The Red Coats".

The Bennington Triangle was featured as one of the haunted locations in the paranormal TV series Most Terrifying Places in America which aired on the Travel Channel in 2018. The episode, title "Unnatural World" told the stories about the reportedly missing persons in a five-year span, and local lore of the "Bennington Monster", a Bigfoot-like creature that supposedly roams these wooded areas.

References

External links

 Adams, Mary Gavel "The Bennington Monster." Green Mountain Whittlin's, 1950
 Stock, R.D.; Zeller, J. "The Strange Disappearances at Mt. Glastenbury." FATE, July 1957
 
 Halkias, Terry.
 
 Citro, Joseph A. Green Mountain Ghosts, Ghouls, and Unsolved Mysteries. University of New England/ Vermont Life, 1994
 Citro, Joseph A. Passing Strange: True Tales of New England Hauntings and Horrors, 1996
 Citro, Joseph A. and Sceurman, Mark. Weird New England, 2005, p. 74-75
 Waller, John D., Lost in Glastenbury, Bennington Banner (VT) (Oct 4, 2008),  accessed 13 March 2017
 The Bennington Triangle, The Cracker Barrel (Wilmington, VT) (Fall 2004), available at vitualvermonter.com, accessed 2009-09-03
 Glastenbury? You won't find it on the map, Rutland Herald (Nov 2, 2007), accessed 2009-09-03
 Glastenbury tales: Town offers no clues to mysteries hanging over it, Rutland Herald (Nov. 8, 1999)

Bennington, Vermont
Geography of Vermont
Glastenbury, Vermont
History of Vermont
Paranormal places in the United States
Paranormal triangles
Shaftsbury, Vermont
Somerset, Vermont
Unexplained disappearances
Woodford, Vermont